In the 2004–05 Premier Soccer League seasonnow known as the South African Premier Division, the top tier of association football in South Africacontained 16 teams. The championship was won by Kaizer Chiefs.

Final table

External links
RSSSF on PSL 04/05

2004-05
2004–05 in African association football leagues
1